Isaiah Stannard (born October 1, 2004) is an American actor. He is best known for his role as Ben in Good Girls.

Career
Isaiah has appeared in a couple television programs, a single film, and a few short films. His first major credited role was a voiceover of the Croatian short film Star Stuff: A Story of Carl Sagan, where he provided the English voiceover for the young Carl Sagan. His other extra work includes his appearance in Brad's Status, and his role in short films such as Party Dress, where he played Harper. His largest role was his recurring appearance in Good Girls, where he played Ben (formerly known as Sadie), a trans character that received a large degree of positive support in his coming-out scene. Isaiah also appeared in Genera+ion as Evan.

Personal life
Isaiah Stannard was born in Manhattan, New York City on October 1, 2004. A notable feature of his life is his openness about being transgender; all of his acting roles after his coming out have been trans characters. Isaiah is outspoken about his experience with transitioning and how it affected his career. During the early stages of filming for Good Girls Isaiah came out as transgender, identifying as male. This led to an open conversation between Isaiah and executive producer Jenna Bans about how best to portray the character.

Filmography

Film

Television

References

External links
 

2004 births
Living people
20th-century American male actors
21st-century American male actors
American male film actors
American male television actors
Male actors from New York City
Transgender male actors